= Yiu Tong Chan =

Yiu Tong Chan is an electrical engineer at the Royal Military College in Kingston, Ontario.

Chan was named a Fellow of the Institute of Electrical and Electronics Engineers (IEEE) in 2016 for his contributions to the development of efficient localizaiton and tracking algorithms.
